Aleksandr Moiseyevich Nekrich, 3 March 1920, Baku – 31 August 1993, Boston) was a Soviet Russian historian. He emigrated to the United States in 1976. He is known for his works on the history of the Soviet Union, especially under Joseph Stalin’s rule.

History 
Born in Baku, Azerbaijan, Nekrich fought in the Red Army ranks during World War II and subsequently graduated from the Moscow University with a degree in history. In 1950, he joined the Russian Academy of Sciences Institute of General History as a senior researcher and a secretary of that institute’s party cell.

Nekrich gained fame for his sensational work June 22, 1941; Soviet Historians and the German Invasion, a study of the Soviet-German confrontation during World War II, which was critical of Stalin and the Soviet leadership over their failure to prepare the country for an anticipated German onslaught. The book was harshly criticized and quickly banned, while Nekrich was excluded from the Communist party. He was allowed, though, to leave the Soviet Union in 1976. Nekrich settled in the U.S. and lectured at Harvard. In emigration, Nekrich published his memoirs (1979), wrote The Punished Peoples: The Deportation and Fate of Soviet Minorities at the End of the Second World War (1978), and coauthored, with Mikhail Heller, Utopia in Power: The History of the Soviet Union from 1917 to the Present (1982).

References

Further reading 
 

1920 births
1993 deaths
Writers from Baku
Moscow State University alumni
Soviet historians
Historians of Russia
Stalinism-era scholars and writers
Writers about the Soviet Union
Soviet people of World War II
Soviet dissidents
Soviet anti-communists
Expelled members of the Communist Party of the Soviet Union
Soviet emigrants to the United States
Harvard University staff
Harvard University faculty